Chester M. De Vonde (October 7, 1872 - January 10, 1928) was an actor, writer, and director of theatrical productions and films.

He wrote the play A Widow's Son. It was described as a Masonic passion play.

Filmography
Cinderella Husband (1917), director
Adam and Some Eves (1918), director
Even as Eve (1920), co-directed with B. A. Rolfe
Voices (1920 film), wrote and directed
West of Zanzibar (1928 film), wrote play film was adapted from
Kongo (1932 film), wrote play film was adapted from

References

1872 births
1928 deaths